Lee Yong-hui (10 June 1931 – 16 October 2022) was a South Korean politician and military officer.

He served in the National Assembly from 1973 to 1980, 1985 to 1988, and lastly from 2004 to 2012.

Lee died in Seoul on 16 October 2022, at the age of 91.

References

1931 births
2022 deaths
20th-century South Korean politicians
Academic staff of Hongik University
South Korean military personnel of the Korean War
21st-century South Korean politicians
Members of the National Assembly (South Korea)
People from North Chungcheong Province
Deputy Speakers of the National Assembly (South Korea)